Gillian Jones (born 19 April 1947) is an Australian actress from Newcastle, New South Wales who is best known for appearances in Twelfth Night, Oscar and Lucinda, Last Train to Freo and the role of Di Paige in the television series Love My Way.  She had a recurring role on the Australian drama Packed to the Rafters since 2009.

Filmography

Film
 1982: Fighting Back - as English teacher
 1982: Heatwave - as Barbie Lee Taylor
 1987: Twelfth Night - as Viola
 1988: Shame - as Tina Farrel
 1989: Echoes of Paradise - as Mitty
 1989: Lover Boy - as Sally
 1996: What I Have Written - as Frrances Bourin/Catherine
 1997: Oscar and Lucinda - as Elizabeth Leplastrier
 1998: Pentuphouse (short) - as Della
 1998: Terra Nova - as Emily
 2003: So Close to Home - as Ramona
 2006: Last Train to Freo - as Maureen
 2007: Lucky Miles - as Chris
 2007: Katoomba (short) - as Kym
 2010: The Tree - as Vonnie
 2014: The Rover - as Grandma
 2015: Mad Max: Fury Road - as a Vuvalini
 2016: Goldstone as Sally
 2016: War Machine as Tashi Tsomo (uncredited)
 2017: Bleeding Steel - as a witch
 2019: Judy and Punch - as Dr. Goodtime
 2019: Acute Misfortune – as Ruth Marr

Television
 1968: Skippy the Bush Kangaroo - as Jane (1 episode)
 1968: Condrabandits - as Marcia Haslek (1 episode)
 1972: Homicide - as Julie Beaumont (1 episode)
 1973: Division 4 - as Wendy (1 episode)
 1974: Silent Number (1 episode)
 1975: Shannon's Mob - Carol (1 episode)
 1986: I Own the Racecourse (TV film) - as Mrs. Hoddel
 1988: Alterations (TV film) - as Rachel
 1990: The Flying Doctors – as Peta Rowlands (1 episode)
 1990: Come In Spinner (TV film) - as Mrs. Malone
 1992: Police Rescue - as Psychiatrist (1 episode)
 1994: Cody: A Family Affair (TV film)
 1996: G.P. - as Jessica Smith (1 episode)
 1997: Wildside - as Anna Carmody (1 episode)
 2004–2007: Love My Way - as Di Paige (main role; 27 episodes)
 2009–2010: Packed to the Rafters - as Rachel 'Chel' Warne (recurring role; 25 episodes)
 2010: Spirited - as Fran Jansen (1 episode)
 2011: The Slap - as Rachel
 2012: Miss Fisher's Murder Mysteries - as Elsie ("1.11")
 2012: Redfern Now - as Ms. McCann, the principal of Clifton College ("1.4")

References

External links
 

Living people
Australian film actresses
Australian television actresses
1947 births